Jorge González Torres (born in 1942 in Mexico City) is a Mexican politician, founder of the Ecologist Green Party of Mexico. He was also the co-president of the Federation of Green Parties of the Americas.

References

 Costumbre viciada, article written by González Torres on El Universal

External links
 Profile
 Interview at TV Azteca

1942 births
Living people
Candidates in the 1994 Mexican presidential election
Ecologist Green Party of Mexico politicians
National Autonomous University of Mexico alumni
Academic staff of the National Autonomous University of Mexico
Academic staff of Universidad Iberoamericana
Politicians from Mexico City
Institutional Revolutionary Party politicians
20th-century Mexican politicians
Universidad Iberoamericana alumni